"But It's Cheating" is a single by Canadian country music group Family Brown. Released in 1980, it was the first single from their seventh studio album Nothing Really Changes. The song reached number one on the RPM Country Tracks chart in Canada in September 1980. The song was re-released in early 1982, peaking at number 30 on the Billboard Hot Country Singles chart in the United States.

Charts

References

1980 singles
Family Brown songs
RCA Records singles
Songs written by Barry Brown (Canadian musician)
1980 songs